Diamond Heart may refer to:

Music
Diamond Heart, an album by Ladies of the Canyon
"Diamond Heart", a song by Lady Gaga from Joanne
"Diamond Heart", a song by BoA from the album The Face
"Diamond Heart", a song by Alan Walker
"Diamond Heart", a song by Marissa Nadler from Songs III: Bird on the Water

Other
Diamond Heart, a series of books by A. H. Almaas
A Diamond Heart Production, an artist development label and publishing company formed by Vanessa Silberman